= 1966 American Samoan constitutional referendum =

American Samoan ballot measure

A constitutional referendum was held in American Samoa on 8 November 1966. The proposed constitution drawn up by the Constitutional Council on 26 September 1966 was approved by voters. The American Department of the Interior approved the changes on 2 June 1967, allowing it to come into force on 1 July 1967.
